Weedfish may refer to:

Adelaide's weedfish, (Heteroclinus adelaidae)
Banded weedfish, (Heteroclinus fasciatus)
Caledonian weedfish, (Springeratus caledonicus)
Cline (weedfish), (Clinitrachus argentatus)
Common weedfish, (Heteroclinus perspicillatus)
Crested weedfish, (Cristiceps australis)
Girls weedfish, (Heteroclinus puellarum)
Golden weedfish, (Cristiceps aurantiacus)
Johnston's weedfish, (Heteroclinus johnstoni)
Kelp weedfish, (Heteroclinus eckloniae)
Kuiters weedfish, (Heteroclinus kuiteri)
Large eye weedfish, (Heteroclinus macrophthalmus)
Large nose weedfish, (Heteroclinus nasutus)
Natal weedfish, (Heteroclinus antinectes)
Ogilby's weedfish, (Heteroclinus heptaeolus)
Rosy weedfish, (Heteroclinus roseus)
Sevenbar weedfish, (Heteroclinus equiradiatus)
Sharp nose weedfish, (Heteroclinus tristis)
Short tassel weedfish, (Heteroclinus flavescens)
Silver-sided weedfish, (Cristiceps argyropleura)
Slender weedfish, (Heteroclinus marmoratus)
Whiteleggs weedfish, (Heteroclinus whiteleggii)
Wilsons weedfish, (Heteroclinus wilsoni)